Sri Lanka competed at the 2004 Summer Paralympics in Athens, Greece. The team included six athletes, all of them men, and won no medals.

Sports

Archery

|-
|align=left|Rajeeva Wickramasinghe
|align=left|Men's individual standing
|579
|13
|W 140-127
|L 147-149
|colspan=4|did not advance
|}

Athletics

Men's field

Powerlifting

Swimming

Wheelchair tennis

See also
Sri Lanka at the Paralympics
Sri Lanka at the 2004 Summer Olympics

References 

Nations at the 2004 Summer Paralympics
2004
Summer Paralympics